Chaim Pinchas Scheinberg (‎ 1 October 1910 – 20 March 2012) was a Polish-born, American-raised, Israeli Haredi rabbi and rosh yeshiva who, from 1965, made his home in the Kiryat Mattersdorf neighborhood of Jerusalem. He was the rosh yeshiva of the Torah Ore yeshiva in Kiryat Mattersdorf and Yeshivas Derech Chaim in Brooklyn. He was a posek (decisor of Jewish law), Gadol HaDor, and one of the last living Torah scholars to have been educated in the yeshivas of prewar Europe. He was often consulted on a range of communal and personal halachic issues. He was one of the rabbinic leaders of Kiryat Mattersdorf, together with Rabbi Yisroel Gans and Rabbi Yitzchok Yechiel Ehrenfeld. He was also a member of the Moetzes Gedolei HaTorah of Israel.

Early years
Chaim Pinchas Scheinberg was born in Ostrov, Poland, the second son of Rabbi Yaakov Yitzchok Scheinberg and Yuspa (Yosefa) Tamback. He was born in his father's absence, as earlier that year, his father had left his wife and firstborn son Avraham Nosson to go to America to avoid conscription into the Polish army. Unable to work on the Jewish Sabbath, Scheinberg's father wasn't able to send the necessary funds to have his wife and son come to America. With the outbreak of World War I in 1914, the family lost contact. By 1919, Scheinberg's father had saved enough money to open his own tailor shop and brought his wife and children to America.

At age 9, Scheinberg moved with his family into a small apartment on the Lower East Side, where his mother gave birth to twins, Shmuel and Chana Baila. After briefly attending public school, Scheinberg enrolled in the Rabbi Jacob Joseph School (RJJ), where he studied until age 14. At that time, Yaakov Yosef Herman, who influenced promising young Jewish men in New York City to advance in their Torah learning, encouraged him to transfer to Rabbi Yehuda Levenberg's Beis Medrash LeRabbonim yeshiva in New Haven, Connecticut, where no secular subjects were taught. Herman also decided that the youth would make a good husband for his third daughter, Bessie, who was then only 12 years old. By the time Scheinberg left the yeshiva at the age of sixteen and a half, he was regarded as a diligent student and had completed the entire Talmud.

At age 17 Scheinberg progressed to Rabbi Isaac Elchanan Theological Seminary (RIETS). There he studied under Rabbis Shlomo Polachek (known as the "Meitcheter Ilui") and Moshe Soloveichik. His learning partners included Rabbis Avigdor Miller, Moshe Bick, Mordechai Gifter, Shachne Zohn, boruch kaplin, and Nosson Meir Wachtfogel, future leaders of American Torah Jewry.

When Scheinberg was 19, Herman suggested the match with his 17-year-old daughter Bessie and the Scheinbergs agreed. Rabbi Boruch Ber Leibowitz, who was a guest at the Herman home at that time, wrote out the engagement contract. At his mother's suggestion, Scheinberg studied for rabbinic ordination in the months before his wedding. He was ordained by Rabbi Moshe Soloveitchik, Rabbi Dr. Bernard Revel, and other rabbis of the yeshiva before his wedding ceremony.

Mir, Poland

With the encouragement of his father-in-law, Scheinberg and his new wife spent their first five years of marriage in the town of Mir, Belarus (then Poland). They lived next-door to the yeshiva, where Scheinberg immersed himself in learning while his wife coped with the impoverished lifestyle. There was no running water, the only source of heat was an oven in the center of their apartment, and the unpaved streets were always muddy. Bessie, however, encouraged her husband to grow in learning, and he developed a reputation as one of the yeshiva's most diligent students.

Theirs was one of the few families in Mir; most of the student body was unmarried. Scheinberg was also one of the few American students at the Mir. Herman had already sent his son, Nochum Dovid, and his wife to Mir right after their marriage, and a few years later he sent his daughter Ruchoma and her new husband, Moshe Shain, as well. Scheinberg's younger brother, Shmuel, came to study at the Mir at the age of 14; he managed to escape on one of the last ships leaving Europe before World War II broke out.

The Scheinbergs' first two daughters, Fruma Rochel and Rivka, were born in Poland. When they were expecting their first child, Scheinberg and his wife visited Rabbi Yisrael Meir Kagan (the Chofetz Chaim), a leader of Ashkenazi Jewry at the time, to receive his blessing. When Scheinberg asked the Chofetz Chaim for an additional blessing since he had come all the way from America to study at the Mir, the Chofetz Chaim quipped, "Moses came down all the way from heaven to teach the Jews Torah. What’s the big deal about coming from America to Europe?!” Then he blessed them.

While in Europe, Scheinberg also learned at the Kaminetz yeshiva and received rabbinic ordination from Rabbi Boruch Ber Leibowitz.

In 1935 the Scheinbergs returned to America because his American citizenship would have expired after more than five years abroad. Soon after his return, Scheinberg was offered the position of mashgiach ruchani (spiritual supervisor) of the Yeshiva Chofetz Chaim in Queens founded by Rabbi Dovid Leibowitz. He served in that position for 25 years until leaving to open his own yeshiva, Torah Ore. Scheinberg was known for the warm and caring relationship he developed with his students, and for the kindnesses he and his wife did for neighbors and visitors in their small apartment. Often their daughters slept two to a bed to make room for unexpected guests. During this time, Scheinberg also became the Rav of Congregation Bakash Shalom Anshei Ostrov on the Lower East Side, where he gave Torah lectures to working men.

The Scheinbergs had two more daughters, Chana and Zelda, and a son, Simcha, in New York. Zelda was married to the late Rabbi Nisson Alpert. They also raised Rivky Kaufman, one of the seven orphans of Bessie's sister Freida, after the latter's sudden death in 1938.

With the help and encouragement of his brother, Rabbi Shmuel Scheinberg, and his son-in-law, Rabbi Chaim Dov Altusky (Fruma Rochel's husband), Scheinberg opened the Torah Ore yeshiva in the Bensonhurst section of Brooklyn in 1960. The yeshiva opened with six students and grew steadily, enrolling many local Sephardi boys who were attracted by Scheinberg's Torah knowledge and warmth. The Scheinbergs treated their students as their own children, raising money to marry them off and even pay their dentist bills.

Move to Israel

In 1963 Bessie's sister Ruchoma visited their father in Israel and toured a planned Haredi housing development in northern Jerusalem called Kiryat Mattersdorf, which was founded by Rabbi Shmuel Ehrenfeld, the Mattersdorfer Rav, who was Ruchoma's neighbor in New York. Upon her return, Ruchoma told Bessie about her desire to buy an apartment there, and Bessie also expressed interest in buying an apartment. Though Scheinberg was skeptical about relocating his family and his American yeshiva to Israel, he made a pilot trip to tour the development and decided that it could work. Ehrenfeld's son, Rabbi Akiva Ehrenfeld, who was his representative in supervising the construction and sale of the apartments, encouraged Scheinberg to relocate his yeshiva to Jerusalem from Bensonhurst, Brooklyn by offering attractive terms for apartments and land for the yeshiva.

The Scheinbergs, their daughter Fruma Rochel and her family, their son Simcha and his family, and over 20 of Scheinberg's students moved into their new homes in May 1965. Rabbi Asa Wittow, a married student who had learned under Scheinberg since 1960 and who also served as his driver in New York, made aliyah with him and moved into the same apartment building.

Scheinberg first established the Torah Ore yeshiva in the Diskin Orphanage building in Jerusalem's Givat Shaul neighborhood. When the Six-Day War broke out in June 1967 and many American tourists headed home, Scheinberg encouraged his students to stay, and none of the American students at Torah Ore left the yeshiva. During the war, Scheinberg showed his complete devotion to his students, giving them encouragement and sleeping together with them in the bomb shelter.

After the war, Scheinberg undertook plans to build a permanent home for his yeshiva. Torah Ore moved into its present building in Kiryat Mattersdorf in 1971. As of 2011, the yeshiva enrolls nearly 800 students, including over 500 kollel students.

Bessie was a key partner in her husband's work, supporting him and his students and opening her home to the many people who sought her husband's counsel. They installed a telephone in their bedroom so callers could reach him at any hour. On Simchat Torah, when hundreds of singing and dancing students escorted Scheinberg home from the yeshiva after the services, she would look on from their sixth-floor apartment. When he came upstairs, he would say to her, "Did you see that? Did you see all those students singing and dancing? That was all because of you. It's all yours, Basha". Similarly, when she came into the yeshiva, he would give up his seat for her, saying, "Basha, this seat belongs to you".

Scheinberg became a central address for Americans in Israel seeking guidance for raising children, finding a neighborhood to live in, finding spouses, and coping with medical issues, as well as regular halachic questions. His approbation was sought for many Hebrew- and English-language halacha books for adults and children. The English sefer Rigshei Lev: Women and tefillah – perspectives, laws and customs cites his halachic opinions extensively. In 2000, his neighborhood lectures to English-speaking women were compiled in a book titled Heart to Heart Talks, published by ArtScroll.

Later life

Bessie, who had been in ill health for years, died on 21 October 2009 at the age of 96. They had been married for  79 and a half years.

Even in his later years, Scheinberg continued to fly abroad to fund-raise for his yeshiva. He always took the Talmudic tractate of Niddah with him and tried to learn all 72 folio-pages during the flight. He was known for never wasting a minute, using the time he spent walking or driving to yeshiva immersed in Torah study. According to his driver, Asa Wittow, he always sat with a Torah book in front of him, even at a wedding, and propped a Mishnah Berurah on the shelf above his kitchen sink while he washed dishes.

He was also famous for wearing many layers of tzitzit. At first, he wore about 150 pairs, but later, due to his fragile health, he wore only about 70 pairs. He had said that he wore them on behalf of people who do not fulfill this mitzvah, but Wittow believed that was not the main reason.

Scheinberg died in the Shaare Zedek Medical Center of Jerusalem at the age of 101 on 20 March 2012 (27 Adar 5772) after a brief illness. He was suffering from an inflammation in the kidneys and from an infection in his vascular system. An estimated 70,000 people attended his funeral, which began at the Torah Ore yeshiva and proceeded to the Mount of Olives. His only son, Rabbi Simcha Scheinberg, succeeds him as rosh yeshiva of Torah Ore.

Works
Derech Emunah U-Bitachon (The Way of Faith and Trust)
Tabaas HaChoshen (see here) – a comprehensive, multi-volume explanation of the Ketzot Hachoshen, first published in 1951
Mishmeres Chaim
Shiurei Rebbe Chaim Pinchas – shiurim and new Torah thoughts on numerous Talmudic tractates, edited by Rabbi Mordechai Levine, Toras Chaim: The Association for the Dissemination of Torah, 2005
Netivot Chaim (translated into English as The Torah Way of Life by Jerusalem Publications: Vol. 1: Bereishis (2004), ; Vol. 2: Shemos (2005); Vol. 4: Bamidbar (2007).

Imrei Chaim

References

Bibliography

External links
Yeshivas Torah Ore website

"HaRav Scheinberg Conquers Hearts And Minds in Gateshead", Dei'ah VeDibur, 2002

Videos, photos: Remembering the Rosh Yeshiva ZT"L
Saying Mishnayos for Rosh Yeshiva ZT"L

Israeli Rosh yeshivas
Rabbi Isaac Elchanan Theological Seminary semikhah recipients
Polish Haredi rabbis
American Haredi rabbis
Haredi rabbis in Israel
American people of Polish-Jewish descent
Israeli people of Polish-Jewish descent
American emigrants to Israel
Rabbi Jacob Joseph School alumni
Israeli centenarians
1910 births
2012 deaths
Moetzes Gedolei HaTorah
Authors of books on Jewish law
Hebrew-language writers
Mir Yeshiva alumni
Men centenarians